Ivan Chekhovich (born 4 January 1999) is a Russian professional ice hockey winger who is currently playing under contract with Lokomotiv Yaroslavl of the Kontinental Hockey League (KHL). He was drafted by the San Jose Sharks in the seventh round of the 2017 NHL Entry Draft with the 212th pick overall.

Playing career
Chekhovich played major junior hockey in North America with Baie-Comeau Drakkar in the Quebec Major Junior Hockey League, prior to his selection by the San Jose Sharks in the last round of the 2017 NHL Entry Draft.

On 21 April 2018, Chekhovich was signed by the Sharks to a three-year, entry-level contract.

With the 2020–21 North American season set to be delayed by the ongoing pandemic, Chekhovich was loaned by the Sharks to remain in his native Russia, on a season long agreement with Torpedo Nizhny Novgorod of the Kontinental Hockey League (KHL) on 19 October 2020. Chekhovich made his KHL debut during the 2020–21 KHL season, and was among the leading rookie scorers in the league, placing fourth in team scoring with 17 goals and 34 points through 43 regular season games. Unable to help Torpedo advance past the first-round in the post-season, Chekhovich was re-assigned by the Sharks to continue his season with AHL affiliate, the San Jose Barracuda on 12 March 2021. He later made his NHL debut on 30 April 2021, in a 0–3 loss to the Colorado Avalanche and finished the season with 4 appearances with the Sharks, registering 1 assist.

On 31 August 2021, with a contract offer to return to Torpedo, Chekhovich opted to mutually terminate the remaining year of his entry-level contract with the San Jose Sharks and was placed on unconditional waivers on 31 August 2021. Unclaimed and as a free agent from the Sharks, Chekhovich returned to Torpedo on a one-year contract on the opening day of the 2021–22 season on 1 September 2021.

On 23 May 2022, Chekhovich left Torpedo as he was traded to fellow KHL club, Lokomotiv Yaroslavl, in exchange for prospects and financial compensation. He was immediately signed to a three-year contract extension to remain with Lokomotiv until 2025.

Career statistics

Regular season and playoffs

International

References

External links

1999 births
Living people
Baie-Comeau Drakkar players
Expatriate ice hockey players in Canada
Expatriate ice hockey players in the United States
Lokomotiv Yaroslavl players
Russian expatriate ice hockey people
Russian ice hockey left wingers
Russian expatriate sportspeople in Canada
Russian expatriate sportspeople in the United States
San Jose Barracuda players
San Jose Sharks draft picks
San Jose Sharks players
Sportspeople from Yekaterinburg
Torpedo Nizhny Novgorod players